Mark Moore (born 1965) is a British record producer and nightclub owner.

Mark Moore may also refer to:

 Mark H. Moore, American professor focusing on nonprofit organizations
 Mark Moore (educator) (born 1961), British educator headmaster and Head of College of Clifton College
 Mark Moore (ice hockey) (born 1977), Canadian retired ice hockey defenseman
 Mark Moore (rower) (born 1939), American rower
 Mark Moore (skier) (born 1961), British Olympic skier
 Mark Moore, owner of Team Moore Racing

See also
Marcus Moore (born 1970), American former Major League Baseball player